Leona Lucila Vidal Roberts (born 1972) is a Falkland Islands curator, radio broadcaster and politician who has served as a Member of the Legislative Assembly for the Stanley constituency since the 2017 general election. She previously served as Director and Manager of the Falkland Islands Museum and National Trust.

Roberts was born in Punta Arenas, Chile to Nelson Vidal and Eileen Biggs (a fifth generation Falkland Islander). The family moved to the Falklands when she was three. After attending Stanley Senior School, Roberts went to the United Kingdom to study Journalistic Law at Stradbroke College in Sheffield, where she met her husband.

In 1989 Roberts became an Assistant Editor at Penguin News in Stanley and then in 1994 she moved to the Government Printing Office. Roberts was appointed Director and Manager of the Falkland Islands Museum and National Trust in 2002 Roberts has also been the host of Children’s Corner on the Falkland Islands Radio Service.

References

1972 births
Living people
Chilean people
Falkland Islands people of Chilean descent
Falkland Islands MLAs 2017–2021
Falkland Islands MLAs 2021–2025
People from Punta Arenas
People from Stanley, Falkland Islands